is a railway station operated by JR Kyushu on the Kagoshima Main Line in Kiyama, Saga Prefecture, Japan.

Lines

Layout
The station consists of two opposed side platforms serving two tracks.

The platforms were extended in March 2013 to enable 9-car trains to stop at the station from the start of the revised timetable on 16 March 2013.

Adjacent stations

History
The station was opened by JR Kyushu on 10 March 1990 as an added station on the existing Kagoshima Main Line track.

Surrounding area
 Kyushu Expressway Kiyama Parking Area
 National Route 3
 Keyakidai New Town (Side Saga)
 Nozomigaoka New Town (Side Fukuoka)
 Suroy Mall Chikushino

See also 
List of railway stations in Japan

References

External links
Keyakidai (JR Kyushu)

Railway stations in Saga Prefecture
Railway stations in Japan opened in 1990